The 2007–08 Barangay Ginebra Kings season was the 29th season of the franchise in the Philippine Basketball Association (PBA).

Key dates
August 19: The 2007 PBA Draft took place at Market! Market! in Bonifacio Global City, Taguig.

Roster

Depth chart

Philippine Cup

Game log

|- bgcolor="#bbffbb"
| 1
| October 19
| Red Bull
| 102–95
| Macapagal (21)
| 
| 
| Cuneta Astrodome
| 1–0
|- bgcolor="#edbebf"
| 2
| October 24
| Talk 'N Text
| 102–111
| Tubid (22)
| 
| 
| Araneta Coliseum
| 1–1
|- bgcolor="#edbebf" 
| 3
| October 27
| Welcoat
| 64–82
| Mamaril (17)
| 
| 
| Roxas City
| 1–2
|- bgcolor="#edbebf" 
| 4
| October 31
| Alaska
| 92–103 OT
| Helterbrand (18)
| 
| 
| Cuneta Astrodome
| 1–3

|- bgcolor="#edbebf" 
| 5
| November 4
| Purefoods
| 76–103
| Tubid (11)
| 
| 
| Cuneta Astrodome
| 1–4
|- bgcolor="#bbffbb" 
| 6
| November 10
| Sta.Lucia
| 103–90
| Helterbrand (24)
| 
| 
| General Santos
| 2–4
|- bgcolor="#edbebf" 
| 7
| November 16
| Air21
| 95–102
| Helterbrand (22)
| 
| 
| Cuneta Astrodome
| 2–5
|- bgcolor="#edbebf" 
| 8
| November 18
| Magnolia
| 90–101
| Menk (22)
| 
| 
| Araneta Coliseum
| 2–6
|- bgcolor="#bbffbb" 
| 9
| November 24
| Coca Cola
| 110–102
| Caguioa (35)
| 
| 
| Araneta Coliseum
| 3–6
|- bgcolor="#bbffbb" 
| 10
| November 28
| Welcoat
| 94–87
| Caguioa (21)
| 
| 
| Araneta Coliseum
| 4–6

|- bgcolor="#edbebf"
| 11
| December 1
| Alaska
| 82–87
| Caguioa (28)
| 
| 
| Lucena City
| 4–7
|- bgcolor="#bbffbb" 
| 12
| December 7
| Air21
| 108–103
| Menk (19)
| 
| 
| Cuneta Astrodome
| 5–7
|- bgcolor="#edbebf" 
| 13
| December 9
| Sta.Lucia
| 78–79
| Helterbrand (19)
| 
| 
| Cuneta Astrodome
| 5–8
|- bgcolor="#bbffbb" 
| 14
| December 16
| Magnolia
| 115–100
| Helterbrand (34), Tubid (27)
| 
| 
| Araneta Coliseum
| 6–8
|- bgcolor="#edbebf"
| 15
| December 21
| Coca Cola
| 82–84
| Salvacion (19)
| 
| 
| Cuneta Astrodome
| 6–9
|- bgcolor="#bbffbb"
| 16
| December 25
| Purefoods
| 100–98
| Salvacion (21), Menk (21)
| 
| 
| Araneta Coliseum
| 7–9

|- bgcolor="#bbffbb"
| 17
| January 4
| Red Bull
| 115–110
| 
| 
| 
| Cuneta Astrodome
| 8–9
|- bgcolor="#edbebf"
| 18
| January 13
| Talk 'N Text
| 87–104
| 
| 
| 
| Araneta Coliseum
| 8–10

Fiesta Conference

Game log

|- bgcolor="#edbebf"
| 1
| March 30
| Red Bull
| 83–89
| 
| 
| 
| Araneta Coliseum
| 0–1

|- bgcolor="#edbebf"
| 2
| April 6
| Alaska
| 89–102
| Caguioa (25)
| 
| 
| Ynares Center
| 0–2
|- bgcolor="#edbebf" 
| 3
| April 12
| Sta.Lucia
| 97–101
| Brown (24)
| 
| 
| Tacloban City
| 0–3
|- bgcolor="#edbebf" 
| 4
| April 18
| Coca Cola
| 81–82
| Caguioa (30)
| 
| 
| Araneta Coliseum
| 0–4
|- bgcolor="#edbebf" 
| 5
| April 20
| Magnolia
| 92–95
| 
| 
| 
| Araneta Coliseum
| 0–5

|- bgcolor="#bbffbb" 
| 6
| May 2
| Purefoods
| 102–99
| 
| Alexander (27)
| 
| Araneta Coliseum
| 1–5
|- bgcolor="#edbebf" 
| 7
| May 7
| Air21
| 88–97
| 
| 
| 
| Araneta Coliseum
| 1–6
|- bgcolor="#edbebf" 
| 8
| May 11
| Talk 'N Text
| 95–105
| Caguioa (24)
| 
| 
| Araneta Coliseum
| 1–7
|- bgcolor="#bbffbb" 
| 9
| May 18
| Welcoat
| 105–70
| 
| 
| 
| Araneta Coliseum
| 2–7
|- bgcolor="#bbffbb" 
| 10
| May 24
| Air21
| 97–92
| Caguioa (39)
| 
| 
| Zamboanga City
| 3–7
|- bgcolor="#bbffbb" 
| 11
| May 28
| Magnolia
| 87–76
| Helterbrand (23)
| Alexander (29)
| 
| Araneta Coliseum
| 4–7

|- bgcolor="#edbebf" 
| 12
| June 1
| Red Bull
| 82–86
| Alexander (27)
| 
| 
| Araneta Coliseum
| 4–8
|- bgcolor="#bbffbb" 
| 13
| June 6
| Sta.Lucia
| 112–104
| Alexander (35) Helterbrand (31)
| 
| 
| Cuneta Astrodome
| 5–8
|- bgcolor="#bbffbb" 
| 14
| June 11
| Purefoods
| 89–81
| Tubid (21)
| 
| 
| Araneta Coliseum
| 6–8
|- bgcolor="#bbffbb" 
| 15
| June 15
| Coca Cola
| 91–84
| Helterbrand (27)
| 
| 
| Araneta Coliseum
| 7–8
|- bgcolor="#bbffbb" 
| 16
| June 29
| Talk 'N Text
| 100–89
| Helterbrand (30)
| 
| 
| Araneta Coliseum
| 8–8

|- bgcolor="#bbffbb" 
| 17
| July 4
| Welcoat
| 111–96
| Caguioa (26)
| 
| 
| Araneta Coliseum
| 9–8
|- bgcolor="#bbffbb" 
| 18
| July 6 
| Alaska
| 97–90
| Helterbrand (20)
| 
| 
| Cuneta Astrodome
| 10–8

 Note: Last playing date on July 6 was originally scheduled on June 22

Transactions

Trades

Additions

Subtractions

References

Barangay Ginebra San Miguel seasons
Barangay